1958 was the 59th season of County Championship cricket in England. Surrey captain Peter May topped the batting averages for the third time and his team won a record seventh successive title. England defeated the touring New Zealand side 4–0 in a Test match series.

Honours
County Championship – Surrey
Minor Counties Championship – Yorkshire Second XI
Wisden Cricketers of the Year (awarded in the 1959 Wisden Cricketers' Almanack) – Les Jackson, Roy Marshall, Arthur Milton, John Reid, Derek Shackleton

Test series

England defeated New Zealand 4–0 with one match drawn in a five match Test series.

County Championship

The County Championship was won by Surrey County Cricket Club, the last of seven consecutive Championships for the county. Hampshire were runners-up.

Leading players
Peter May topped the averages with 2,231 runs scored at a batting average of 63.74.

Les Jackson topped the bowling averages with 143 wickets taken at a bowling average of 10.99 runs per wicket.

References

Annual reviews
 Playfair Cricket Annual 1959
 Wisden Cricketers' Almanack 1959

1958 in English cricket
English cricket seasons in the 20th century